The assassination of Taha Carım, a Turkish diplomat and ambassador to the Holy See, took place on 9 June 1977 in Rome, Italy.

Background
The fatal attack on Carım took place two years after the assassination of a Turkish ambassador to Austria, Daniş Tunalıgil and assassination of a Turkish ambassador to France, Ismail Erez by the Armenian militant organization Justice Commandos of the Armenian Genocide (JCAG). Taha Carım was serving as an Ambassador to the Holy See since 2 November 1973. He was already threatened to be killed by Armenian militant groups in March 1977. Due to earlier attacks on Turkish diplomats resulting in death, the Turkish Ministry of Foreign Affairs decided to send security personnel to Turkish diplomatic missions abroad. Some time later, Ambassador Carım requested the Italian police to lift the security service. Instead, he began to carry a pistol to protect himself.

The attack
Carım was returning to his residence, and was shot by two unidentified gunmen from front and back having no chance of resistance. The responsibility was claimed by JCAG.

Legacy
In 2016, the papacy finally condemned the 1977 assassination of Taha Carım in order to resolve a dispute with Turkey about the Armenian genocide.

See also
List of attacks by the Justice Commandos Against Armenian Genocide
List of Turkish diplomats assassinated by Armenian militant organisations
Assassination of Daniş Tunalıgil
Assassination of İsmail Erez
Assassination of Galip Balkar
Assassination of Erkut Akbay
Assassination of Orhan Gündüz
ASALA

References

Assassinations
Political history of Turkey
1977 in Vatican City
1977 murders in Italy
Terrorist attacks attributed to Armenian militant groups
1977 in international relations
Carim, Taha
Assassinated Turkish diplomats
Italy–Turkey relations
Attacks on diplomatic missions in Italy
June 1977 events in Europe
Deaths by person in Italy
Terrorist incidents in Italy in 1977
June 1977 crimes